Abraham ben Joseph of Orleans was an early 12th-century French Tosafist and the son of Joseph Bekhor Shor and the brother of Saadia Bekhor Shor. Some have suggested that he is  identical with Abraham ben Rabbi Joce (the Chief Rabbi of London in 1186). Many of his interpretations of the Talmud are quoted several times in the Tosafot.

Biography 
Rabbi Abraham, was born in Orléans, France in about 1140. His father was a famous Tosafist and a leading member of the Orleans Jewish community. In his early years, Rabbi Abraham occupied a similar position. It was also during this time that he became acquainted with Rabbeinu Tam. Sometime after his daughter married Judah ben Isaac Messer Leon, Rabbi Abraham may have moved to London where he served as Chief Rabbi in 1186. Amongst his alleged descendants are Ephraim Zalman Shor, Aaron ben Samuel of Frankfurt, and Joseph Brodsky.

References 

12th-century French rabbis
French Tosafists
1140s births